Qingdao No. 2 High School of Shandong Province (Chinese: 山东省青岛第二中学; pinyin: Qīngdǎo Èr Zhōng) is a public high school located in the Laoshan District of Qingdao, Shandong Province, China. The school was founded in 1925 and was designated as a key high school in Shandong Province in 1953. Qingdao No.2 Middle School has been recognized as a National Demonstration School for the New Curriculum and New Textbooks of Senior High School Education, an Advanced Collective of the National Education System, a National Model School for Moral Education, and a National Demonstration School for Ecological Civilization Education. 

The school covers an area of 264 acres and is situated on the foothills of Laoshan Mountain, with a scenic view of the Yellow Sea. It is equipped with advanced facilities including a science and innovation center, a gymnasium, an athletic field, an art building, and a student dormitory. The school provides a safe, comfortable, and humanized learning and living environment, as well as high-quality services that are available around the clock.

Qingdao No.2 Middle School has a faculty of 256 members, including 2 recipients of the State Council Special Allowance, 12 senior teachers, and 60 high-level teachers. Nearly 50 teachers have received national or provincial honors, and over 130 have been awarded honors at the municipal level. The school's teaching staff is among the best in the province.

The school has over 3,000 students, and it consistently ranks first in Qingdao in terms of the number of students admitted to top universities such as Tsinghua and Peking University. In the past three years, 30 students have been admitted to these universities. In the 2022 college entrance examination, the school's top students achieved remarkable results, with 2 ranking in the top 50 in the province, 3 ranking in the top 100, and 11 ranking in the top 300. Ten students were admitted to Tsinghua and Peking University, and nearly 100 were admitted to other top universities in China.

As the first educational group in Qingdao, Qingdao No.2 Middle School Education Group consists of three member schools: Qingdao No.2 Middle School Academy Harbor Branch, Qingdao No.2 Middle School Branch, and Haier Road School (to be opened in the fall of 2022). The education group leverages the high-quality educational resources of Qingdao No.2 Middle School, innovates its system and mechanism, and explores a cooperative education model that spans regions, stages of education, and ownership. The group has played a leading and demonstrative role in promoting the development of collective education among primary and secondary schools in Qingdao.

See also 

Education in the People's Republic of China
National College Entrance Examination
Imperial examination

References

External links 
 Official website of Qingdao No. 2 High School
 Official website of Qingdao Yucai Middle School (Simplified Chinese)

High schools in Shandong
Education in Qingdao